The Geographia Map Company is an independently owned U.S. publisher of road maps. The company is based in Hackensack, New Jersey.

Geographia was founded in 1911 by Alexander Gross (1879 -1958), a native of Hungary who had established Geographia, Ltd, a commercial map publisher in Fleet Street in London. In the United States, the new Geographia initially produced maps of the New York area, expanding into neighboring urban areas.

Beginning in the 1940s, Geographia entered a period of rapid growth, introducing world maps and atlases, topical maps detailing aspects of World War II, and a catalog of atlases, street guide books ("Red Books"), travel guides ("Famous Guides"), wall maps, and street atlases covering dozens of cities in the United States and Canada.

By the late 1950s, Geographia maps had been introduced in Akron, Atlanta, Atlantic City, Baltimore, Binghamton, Birmingham (AL), Buffalo, Charleston (SC), Chicago, Cincinnati, Cleveland, Denver, Detroit, Gary, Grand Rapids, Honolulu, Kansas City, Los Angeles, Louisville, Miami, Milwaukee, Minneapolis/St. Paul, Montreal, New Orleans, Norfolk (VA), Oakland (CA), Oklahoma City, Omaha, Philadelphia, Pittsburgh, Portland (OR), Providence, Richmond (VA), Rochester, St. Louis, San Diego, San Francisco, Seattle, Syracuse, Toledo, Toronto, Washington (DC), Wilmington (DE), among other locales. These folded map titles were housed within a cardstock cover featuring photography of each city's skyline on the front cover, and an alphabetical listing of Geographia's catalog on the rear cover. The maps themselves were large-scale, full color on the detail side, black-and-white on the reverse. Each featured Geographia's characteristic style of cartography, which resembled that of both the forerunner Geographia, Ltd., and the subsequent Geographer's A-Z (also based in the UK)  These maps were often distributed by local newsagents, a strategy also employed by a number of Geographia's competitors.

By the end of the 1970s, the vast majority of this catalog had gone out of print, and has since become rather collectible. A handful of titles in the northeastern United States remained in print into the 1990s.

The company was purchased by the Rand McNally Corporation in the late 1980s, before being re-purchased by its original owners several years later. Based in Hackensack, New Jersey, Geographia publishes a number of folded maps, guidebooks, atlases, and wall maps focusing on the greater New York metropolitan area.

References

External links
Geographia website
Current Geographia website

Mass media companies of the United States
Map companies of the United States
Map publishing companies
Map companies of the United Kingdom
Companies established in 1911